Heleen W.A.M. Sancisi-Weerdenburg (23 May 1944, in Haarlem – 28 May 2000, in Utrecht), was a Dutch ancient historian, specializing in classical Greek and Achaemenid history.

Sancisi-Weerdenburg began her studies in ancient history at the University of Leiden, graduating in 1967 to research under the supervision of Professor W. den Boer, a specialist in Greek history. For her doctoral thesis she set herself the task, which turned into a perennial theme, of trying to disentangle the complex realities of the Achaemenid Empire from the distorting web created by Greek literary conventions. To do this, she studied Old Persian, primarily on her own, and Iranian archaeology with Louis Vanden Berghe in Ghent.
She received her doctor of letters in history and archaeology from Leiden University in 1980. Having taught first at the University of Groningen 1975–89, she achieved the Professorship in Ancient History at Utrecht in 1990. She was a pioneering scholar of ancient Greek history and Persian history. Her work stressed the importance of returning to the classical authors (including the Greek “father of history,” Herodotus, and the Athenian playwright Aeschylus) with fresh critical awareness of the importance of reading them against the backdrop of subtexts and agendas embedded in their complex perceptions of the ancient Persian histories and their 200-year-long empire founded by Cyrus the Great.

In the historiography of the classical tradition and its modern elaborations, the ancient Achaemenid Persian peoples who fought with the Greeks in the so-called Persian Wars became the quintessential Other. Layers of assumptions of Western cultural primacy made it possible to take at face value the words of the Greeks, even when important cues within those sources, combined with primary evidence from the Persian vantage point, cried out for critical reappraisal. Sancisi-Weerdenburg systematically tackled an array of astutely targeted issues in Western traditions on the Achaemenid Persian empire—including the notion of decadence as a defining feature of ancient Persian kingship and the notion of the role of harem intrigue as the defining social maneuverability of women in the empire. The themes that became touchstones of the new historical agenda on the Persian empire spearheaded by Sancisi-Weerdenburg invariably resonated with concerns that invited engagement and energetic debate by a stimulating range of scholars.

Heleen W.A.M. Sancisi-Weerdenburg died of cancer at the age of 56 in Utrecht, the Netherlands.

Bibliography
Heleen Sancisi-Weerdenburg was a prolific writer on Achaemenid history with numerous publications in both Dutch and English. Only the most important, are listed here.
J.-W. Drijvers, J. de Hond and H. Sancisi-Weerdenburg, eds., “Ik hadde de nieusgiergigheid.” De reizen door het Nabije Oosten van Cornelis de Bruijn (ca. 1652-1727), (Mededelingen en Verhandelingen van het Vooraziatisch-Egyptische Genootschap “Ex Oriente Lux,” Leiden 31), Leiden and Louvain, 1997.
A. Kuhrt and H. Sancisi-Weerdenburg, eds., Achaemenid History III: method and theory, Leiden, 1988.
H. Sancisi-Weerdenburg, “Colloquium Early Achaemenid History,” Persica  9, 1980, pp. 231–32.
Eadem, “Was there ever a Median empire?” in A. Kuhrt and H. Sancisi-Weerdenburg, eds., Achaemenid History III, 1988, pp. 197–212.
Sources, Structures & Synthesis: Proceedings of the Groningen 1983 Achaemenid History Workshop (Achaemenid History Series Vol 1) by Heleen Sancisi-Weerdenburg (Hardcover - Dec. 1, 1987)
The Greek Sources: Proceedings of the Groningen 1984 Achaemenid History Workshop (Achaemenid History Series Vol 2) by Heleen Sancisi-Weerdenburg, et al. (Hardcover - Dec. 1987)
Method and Theory: Proceedings of the London 1985 Achaemenid History Workshop (Achaemenid History Workshop Series, Vol 3) by Amelie Kuhrt, et al. (Hardcover - Dec. 1, 1988)
Centre and Periphery: Proceedings of the Groningen 1986 Achaemenid History Workshop (Achaemenid History Workshop Series Vol 4) by Heleen Sancisi-Weerdenburg, et al. (Hardcover - Dec. 1990)
The Roots of the European Tradition: Proceedings of the Groningen 1987 Achaemenid History Workshop (Achaemenid History Series Vol 5) by Heleen Sancisi-Weerdenburg (Hardcover - Dec. 1990)
Asia Minor & Egypt: Old Cultures in a New Empire (Achaemenid History Workshop Vol 6) by Heleen Sancisi-Weerdenburg, et al. (Hardcover - Dec. 1991)
Through Travellers' Eyes: European Travellers on the Iranian Monuments (Achaemenid History Worhsop Series Vol 7) by Heleen Sancisi-Weerdenburg, et al. (Hardcover - Dec. 1991)
Continuity & Change: Proceedings of the Last Achaemenid History Workshop 1990 (Achaemenid History Workshop Vol 8) by Heleen Sancisi-Weerdenburg, Amélie Kuhrt, and Margaret Cool Root (Hardcover - Dec. 1994)
Persepolis Seal Studies: An Introduction With Provisional Concordances of Seal Numbers & Associated Documents on Fortification Tablets I-2087 (Achaemenid History Workshop Series Vol 9) Eisenbrauns (December 1, 1996)

References

1944 births
2000 deaths
20th-century Dutch archaeologists
20th-century Dutch historians
Dutch women historians
Historians of the Middle East
Historians of Iran
Writers from Haarlem
Leiden University alumni
Academic staff of the University of Groningen
Academic staff of Utrecht University
Dutch women archaeologists
Iranologists
Dutch classical scholars